Even as IOU is a 1942 short subject directed by Del Lord starring American slapstick comedy team The Three Stooges (Moe Howard, Larry Fine and Curly Howard). It is the 65th entry in the series released by Columbia Pictures starring the comedians, who released 190 shorts for the studio between 1934 and 1959.

Plot
The Stooges are con men who are selling phony racing forms to everyone especially they sold one to a man which he said that the racing form was expired and the Stooges stole his money and threatens to call the cops. After evading the policeman they help a destitute mother and her daughter by utilizing the money from the child's piggy bank, and ultimately winning a horse race. Riding high on their win, the boys come across two swindlers who trick them into buying retired race horse, Seabasket (a play on Seabiscuit). Broke again, the Stooges start taking care of the old horse, with Curly managing to accidentally swallow a Vitamin Z pill meant for the horse. However, the error allows Curly to give birth to an Equidae, which they crown as another winning race horse.

Cast

Credited

Production notes 
Filming of Even as IOU was completed April 18–22, 1942.

There are several references to The New Deal instituted by President Franklin D. Roosevelt:
Curly's "FBI Loan" is ignorance pertaining to an FHA insured loan (Federal Housing Administration).
Curly describes his taking the child's piggy bank as "only a lend-lease" referring to the Lend-Lease Law passed by Congress in 1941.

The idea of Curly swallowing Vitamin Z and hatching a colt generates from the use of synthetic vitamins as dietary supplements, which was both popular and experimental in the early 1940s.

Moe requesting an operator patch him through to "Ripley, yeah, believe it or not." This is one of the earliest mentions of Ripley's in popular media.

The "ma-ma" doll gag had recently been used by Laurel and Hardy in 1940's Saps at Sea. It would be used again in the Stooges' 1951 short Scrambled Brains.

References

External links
 
 

1942 films
1942 comedy films
The Three Stooges films
American black-and-white films
Films directed by Del Lord
American horse racing films
Columbia Pictures short films
American slapstick comedy films
1940s English-language films
1940s American films